Noi (English "We" or "Us"/Spanish: Somos) is the twelfth studio album by Italian singer-songwriter Eros Ramazzotti released on 13 November 2012 by Universal Music. The album, produced by Ramazzotti and Luca Chiaravalli, was preceded by the single "Un angelo disteso al sole", released on 12 October 2012.

Background
On 21 July 2011, it was announced that Eros Ramazzotti had left Sony Music, signing a recording contract with Universal. A few days later, Ramazzotti's manager Giancarlo Giannini announced that he had planned to start working on new material between September and October 2011, in order to release a new album in November 2012. However, in January 2012 Ramazzotti split with his manager, replacing him with Michele Torpedine. This led to speculations that the release date of the album was postponed to January 2013, but Universal Music denied it, confirming the release of a new studio set in 2012.

In August 2012, it was announced that the new album would be released on 13 November 2012, while the album title was revealed on 4 September 2012. The artwork was published on 11 October 2012 through Ramazzotti's official Google+ account. Two days later, the first single from the album, titled "Un angelo disteso al sole", was internationally released to radios as well as a digital download. Details about the remaining tracks included on the album and the guest artists appearing on it were revealed on 15 October 2012, when the album's track list was officially confirmed.

The album features guest appearances by former Pussycat Dolls' lead singer Nicole Scherzinger, as well as Italian operatic pop trio Il Volo, Belgian band Hooverphonic and Italian rap group Club Dogo. The track "Io sono te" also features a monologue by Giancarlo Giannini on the Italian edition of the album and by Andy García on the international release. During a press conference following the release of the album, Ramazzotti revealed that he also wanted to record songs with Eminem, Madonna and Jennifer Lopez, but they all turned down his proposal. On 12 June 2013, a music video for "Fino all'estasi" featuring Scherzinger premiered on Ramazzotti's VEVO account.

Track listing

Musicians
Eros Ramazzotti – vocals, guitar, backing vocals, electric guitar, acoustic guitar, keyboards, piano
Tim Pierce – guitar, acoustic guitar, electric guitar
Luca Chiaravalli – guitar, electric guitar, acoustic guitar, keyboards, piano, strings, backing vocals
Saverio Grandi – guitar, acoustic guitar, keyboards, piano, backing vocals
Giorgio Secco – guitar, acoustic guitar, electric guitar
Biagio Sturiale – guitar, acoustic guitar, electric guitar
Reggie Hamilton – bass
Paolo Costa – bass
Marco Barusso – bass, guitar, electric guitar
Alex Callier – bass, guitar, electric guitar, backing vocals
Josh Freese – drums
Lele Melotti – drums
Gary Novak – drums
Luca Scarpa – keyboards, piano, organ
Serafino Tedesi – violin
Dario Cecchini – flute, baritone saxophone
Massimo Zanotti – trombone, trumpet
Gabriele Bolognesi – alto saxophone, tenor saxophone
Renato Di Bonito – backing vocals
Gianluigi Fazio – backing vocals
Roberta Granà – backing vocals
William Moretti – backing vocals
Lara Pagin – backing vocals
Claudio Placanica – backing vocals
Cristina Valenti – backing vocals

Charts

Weekly charts

Year-end charts

Certifications

|-
!scope="row"|Venezuela (APROFON)
|Gold
|5,000x
|-

Release history

References

External links
 

2012 albums
Eros Ramazzotti albums
Italian-language albums
Spanish-language albums